Arles, Roman and Romanesque Monuments (French: Arles, monuments romains et romans) is an area containing a collection of monuments in the city centre of Arles, France, that has been listed as a UNESCO World Heritage Site since 1981.

The official brief description for this as a World Heritage Site is:Arles is a good example of the adaptation of an ancient city to medieval European civilization. It has some impressive Roman monuments, of which the earliest – the arena, the Roman theatre and the cryptoporticus (subterranean galleries) – date back to the 1st century B.C. During the 4th century Arles experienced a second golden age, as attested by the baths of Constantine and the necropolis of Alyscamps. In the 11th and 12th centuries, Arles once again became one of the most attractive cities in the Mediterranean. Within the city walls, Saint-Trophime, with its cloister, is one of Provence's major Romanesque monuments.

The protected area covers 65 ha. The following buildings are located within this area:
 Arles Amphitheatre
 The Roman theatre
 Cryptoporticus  and Roman forum: Located underneath the Chapel of the Jesuit College and the City Hall, this cryptoporticus was likely built by the Greeks in the 1st century BC. It may have been used as a slave barracks.
 The Thermes of Constantine: A public bath, which was built during the 4th century AD.  
 Ramparts of the Roman castrum
 The Alyscamps
 The Church of St. Trophime and its cloister
 Roman exedra (courtyard of Museon Arlaten)

References

World Heritage Sites in France
Landmarks in France
Buildings and structures in Arles
Roman Arles
Buildings and structures in Bouches-du-Rhône
Tourist attractions in Bouches-du-Rhône